A blast radius is the distance from the source that will be affected when an explosion occurs. A blast radius is often associated with bombs, mines, explosive projectiles (propelled grenades), and other weapons with an explosive charge.

Use in software security 

In cloud computing, the term blast radius is used to designate the impact that a security breach of one single component of an application could have on the overall composite application. Reducing the blast radius of any component is a security good practice. The concept is used in Zero trust security model and Chaos engineering.

See also 
Overpressure

References 

Explosive weapons